Tatyana Zharganova (born 24 July 1980) is a Belarusian gymnast. She competed at the 1996 Summer Olympics and the 2000 Summer Olympics.

References

1980 births
Living people
Belarusian female artistic gymnasts
Olympic gymnasts of Belarus
Gymnasts at the 1996 Summer Olympics
Gymnasts at the 2000 Summer Olympics
Sportspeople from Grodno